Leah Dobson (born 6 October 2001) is an English cricketer who currently plays for Yorkshire and Northern Diamonds. She plays as a right-handed batter.

Early life
Dobson was born on 6 October 2001 in Scarborough, North Yorkshire. At youth level for Yorkshire, she was the Under-17 Batter of the Season in 2018, and hit 161 from 81 balls in an Under-17 T20 match.

Domestic career
Dobson made her county debut in 2018, for Yorkshire against Kent. In 2019, she scored 92 runs at an average of 18.40 in the County Championship, including her career high score of 40 in a 2 wicket victory over Nottinghamshire. She only played one match for Yorkshire in 2021, scoring 4* against North East Warriors before rain cut the match short.

Dobson was selected in the Northern Diamonds squad for the 2020 Rachael Heyhoe Flint Trophy, but did not play a match that season. She made her debut for the side in 2021, in their opening match of the Charlotte Edwards Cup against North West Thunder. She went on to score 111 runs in the tournament for her side, including her Twenty20 high score of 44*. She also played five times in the Rachael Heyhoe Flint Trophy, and made her List A high score of 49 against Southern Vipers. Dobson appeared in six matches for Northern Diamonds in 2022 across the Charlotte Edwards Cup and the Rachael Heyhoe Flint Trophy, with a top score of 34* in the Rachael Heyhoe Flint Trophy final, helping Diamonds to their first title. At the end of the 2022 season, it was announced that Dobson had signed her first professional contract with Northern Diamonds.

References

External links

2001 births
Living people
Cricketers from Scarborough, North Yorkshire
Yorkshire women cricketers
Northern Diamonds cricketers